Abdelaziz Ali Guechi (born 1 November 1990) is an Algerian footballer who plays as a defender.

International career
Ali Guechi was called up to participate in the 2010 UNAF U-23 Tournament. On 15 December 2010, he scored the first goal against the Moroccan under-23 side. On 16 November 2011, he was selected as part of Algeria's squad for the 2011 CAF U-23 Championship in Morocco.

Statistics

References

External links

Living people
1990 births
Algerian footballers
Algerian expatriate footballers
USM Annaba players
RC Arbaâ players
USM El Harrach players
ASM Oran players
AS Gabès players
CA Bordj Bou Arréridj players
MO Béjaïa players
Al-Adalah FC players
US Tataouine players
Al-Thoqbah Club players
Expatriate footballers in Tunisia
Expatriate footballers in Saudi Arabia
Algerian expatriate sportspeople in Tunisia
Algerian expatriate sportspeople in Saudi Arabia
Algerian Ligue Professionnelle 1 players
Tunisian Ligue Professionnelle 1 players
Saudi Professional League players
Saudi First Division League players
Algeria under-23 international footballers
Algerian Ligue 2 players
2011 CAF U-23 Championship players
People from Annaba
Algeria youth international footballers
Association football defenders
21st-century Algerian people